"Ready" Freddie Washington is an American session bassist who has played with artists such as Herbie Hancock, Michael Jackson, Al Jarreau, Aaron Neville, Lionel Richie, Anita Baker, B.B. King, Elton John, Patrice Rushen, Stevie Wonder and Whitney Houston, Donald Fagen, The Crusaders, George Benson, Deniece Williams, Johnny Mathis, Burt Bacharach, Kenny Loggins and Steely Dan.

He is best known for his songwriting contribution to "Forget Me Nots" by Patrice Rushen, which heavily features his bass work and was later sampled by Will Smith for "Men in Black". During the 1990s, Washington and Rushen were part of a popular rhythm section known as "The Meeting". More recently, Washington has toured with Steely Dan.

In 2005, Washington was a participant in Star Licks Productions’ All-Star Bass Series.

References

External links
Freddie Washington Interview NAMM Oral History Library, January 24, 2015.

Year of birth missing (living people)
Living people
American bass guitarists
American rhythm and blues bass guitarists
American male bass guitarists
American session musicians
The Dukes of September members